David Heurtel is a Canadian politician, who was elected to the National Assembly of Quebec in a by-election on December 9, 2013. He represented the electoral district of Viau as a member of the Quebec Liberal Party until 2018.

Electoral record

References

French Quebecers
Living people
Members of the Executive Council of Quebec
Quebec Liberal Party MNAs
Politicians from Montreal
1971 births
21st-century Canadian politicians